The Dayton Bombers were an ECHL ice hockey team located in Dayton, Ohio. The team most recently was in the North Division of the ECHL's American Conference. The Bombers originally played at Hara Arena from 1991 to 1996. The team moved to the Ervin J. Nutter Center on the campus of Wright State University in Fairborn, Ohio, in 1996.

On March 30, 2009, it was announced that the Bombers would not be playing during the 2009–10 season. Despite the arrival of the International Hockey League's Dayton Gems, the Bombers had not folded nor planned to relocate at that time, and continued to aim towards securing additional investors and season ticket holders to play in Dayton again for 2010–11.  However, on June 25 of that year, the Bombers' owner turned the team's membership back to the ECHL, citing lack of a suitable business partner or re-entry plan.

Season records 
Note: W = Wins, L = Losses, T = Ties, OTL = Overtime losses, SOL = Shootout losses, GF = Goals for, GA = Goals against, PIM = Penalties infraction minutes

Playoffs
1991–92: Lost to Cincinnati 3-0 in first round.
1992–93: Lost to Nashville 3-0 in quarterfinals.
1993–94: Lost to Toledo 2-1 in first round.
1994–95: Defeated Huntington 3-1 in first round; lost to Greensboro 3-2 in quarterfinals.
1995–96: Lost to Toledo 3-0 in first round.
1996–97: Lost to Richmond 3-1 in first round.
1997–98: Lost to Wheeling 3-2 in first round.
1998–99: Lost to Roanoke 3-1 in first round.
1999–00: Lost to Peoria 3-0 in first round.
2000–01: Defeated Charlotte 3-2 in first round; lost to Peoria 3-0 in quarterfinals.
2001–02: Defeated Cincinnati 3-0 in first round; defeated Johnstown 3-0 in quarterfinals; defeated Atlantic City 3-1 in semifinals; lost to Greenville 4-0 in finals.
2002–03: Did not qualify.
2003–04: Did not qualify.
2004–05: Did not qualify.
2005–06: Did not qualify.
2006–07: Defeated Trenton 3-0 in first round; defeated Cincinnati 4-3 in quarterfinals; defeated Florida 4-3 in semifinals; lost to Idaho 4-1 in finals.
2007–08: Lost to Johnstown 2-0 in first round.
2008–09: Did not qualify.

All-time record vs. other clubs

Dayton Bombers club records 
Players
 Most points, season - 119 Darren Colbourne (1991–92)
 Most points, game - 7 Tom Nemeth vs Toledo, Oct. 23, 1993 & Jamie Ling vs Roanoke, Jan. 15, 1999
 Most goals, season - 69 Darren Colbourne (1991–92)
 Most goals, game - 5 Jamie Ling vs Roanoke, Jan. 15, 1999 & Chanse Fitzpatrick vs Trenton, Nov. 3, 2007
 Most assists, season - 82 Tom Nemeth, 1993–94
 Most assists, game - 6 Tom Nemeth vs Toledo, Oct. 23, 1993
 Most PIM, season - 429 Darren Langdon, 1992–93
 Most PIM, game - 39 Derek Ernest vs Roanoke, Nov. 23, 2000

Goaltenders
 Most appearances: 51, Michael Ayers (2004–05)
 Most minutes: 2,937 min, Michael Ayers (2004–05)
 Most wins: 23, Adam Berkhoel (2006–07)
 Most losses: 28, Michael Ayers (2004–05)
 Most overtime Losses: 7, Alex Westlund (1999-00)
 Most shots- 1,627, Michael Ayers (2004–05)
 Most saves- 1,485, Michael Ayers (2005–06)
 Most shutouts- 5, Adam Berkhoel (2006–07)
 Lowest GAA- 2.22, Alex Westlund (2000–01)
 Best save percentage: .930,  Alex Westlund (2000–01)

Team
 Most points- 96 (2000–01)
 Most wins- 45 (2000–01)
 Most losses- 46 (2005–06)
 Most goals scored- 316 (1993–94)
 Fewest points- 46 (2005–06)
 Fewest losses- 17 (1994–95)
 Fewest GAA- 191 (2006–07)
 Most PIM- 2,496 (1999-00)
Longest winning streak
 Overall- 8 Oct. 9-Nov. 5, 1994
 Home- 13 Oct. 28-Dec. 27, 2001
 Road- 5 Oct. 28-Nov. 14, 2000
Longest winless streak
 Overall- 16 Feb. 24-Apr. 1, 2006
 Home- 9 Jan. 4-Feb. 8, 2005
 Road- 13 Jan. 18-Mar. 26, 2003
Regular Season Game Attendance Record
 10,057 vs Peoria, Jan. 23, 2004
Postseason Game Attendance Record
 4,447 vs Idaho, May 27, 2007 Game 3 Kelly Cup Finals
Regular Season Attendance Record
 158,492 (1998–99)

All-time playoff record vs. other clubs

NHL alumni
The following is a list of players who have gone on to play in the NHL.

 Kaspars Astashenko
 Jean-Sebastien Aubin
 Eric Boguniecki
 Kevin Colley
 Riley Cote
 John Emmons
 Trevor Frischmon
 Mark Flood
 Sean Gagnon
 Steven Goertzen
 Erich Goldmann
 Greg Kuznik
 Darren Langdon
 Dan LaCosta
 Kent McDonell
 Mike Minard
 Brandon Smith
 Ole-Kristian Tollefsen
 Pascal Trepanier
 Stephen Valiquette
 Daryl Reaugh
 David Van Drunen
 Mark Lawrence
 Tyler Sloan
 Philippe Dupuis

References

External links 
 Dayton Bombers official message board
 Official Message Board of the 218th Black Sheep Squadron - A Dayton Bombers Supporters Group
 ECHL site

1991 establishments in Ohio
2009 disestablishments in Ohio
Defunct ECHL teams
Defunct ice hockey teams in Ohio
Fairborn, Ohio
Ice hockey clubs disestablished in 2009
Ice hockey teams in Dayton, Ohio
Ice hockey clubs established in 1991
Wright State University